Willis Group Holdings plc was a multinational risk advisor, insurance brokerage and reinsurance brokerage company with its headquarters in the Willis Building in London until its merger of equals with financial services company Towers Watson in 2016. It was the world's third-largest insurance broker when measured by revenues. Willis has around 400 offices in 120 countries and approximately 18,000 employees.

Willis was previously listed on the New York Stock Exchange before its early-2016 'merger of equals' with Towers Watson. After the deal closed, the combined company began trading on the Nasdaq exchange under the symbol, WLTW (Nasdaq: WLTW).

History 

The company was founded by Henry Willis in London in 1828, and initially operated as Henry Willis & Co. In 1898 it merged with Faber Brothers (founded in 1886) to form Willis Faber, and then in 1928 it merged with Dumas & Wylie (founded in 1843) to create Willis, Faber & Dumas. It was first listed on the London Stock Exchange in 1976 as Willis Faber.

It expanded into the United States in 1990 when it merged with Corroon & Black (founded as R. A. Corroon & Co. in 1905) to form the Willis Corroon Group. In 1998 in a leveraged buyout the company was acquired by Trinity Acquisition on behalf of KKR, and in 1999 the name Willis Group was adopted. It was first listed on the New York Stock Exchange in 2001.

In October 2008, Willis acquired Hilb, Rogal & Hobbs Co. (HRH), one of the largest insurance and risk management intermediaries in North America and this has boosted their North American presence, as well as acquired Glencairn Limited which has augmented its Lloyd's of London Market strength.

Willis announced plans in 2009 to relocate its registered office from Bermuda to Ireland. Its shareholders approved the move in December 2009, and the company announced on 31 December 2009, that its reorganisation has been completed and the new parent company of the Willis Group – known as Willis Group Holdings Public Limited Company – is incorporated in Ireland.

In 2015, the Court of Appeal of England and Wales held that the Group was entitled to an interim injunction to prevent Jardine Lloyd Thompson, a competing firm of brokers, from unfairly recruiting its remaining staff. More than 20 employees, including nearly all senior staff in one department, had left Willis to work for JLT.

Merger 

On 30 June 2015, Willis Group announced it would merge with Towers Watson to form Willis Towers Watson. It was stated that the combined company operated in 120 countries, with a workforce of approximately 39,000 employees and revenues of $8.2 billion and a value of $18 billion. The merger was concluded on 5 January 2016 after all regulatory approvals were received.

Buildings

Willis moved into the Willis Building, its new London headquarters, in May 2008.

The Willis Building in Ipswich, England, is one of the earliest buildings designed by Norman Foster after establishing Foster Associates. Constructed between 1970 and 1975 it is now seen as a landmark in the development of the 'high tech' architectural style.  It is one of the youngest buildings to be given Grade I listed building status in Britain.

The 110-story Sears Tower in Chicago was renamed the Willis Tower in July 2009.  Willis secured the naming rights as part of its agreement to lease  of space in the  tower. It was the world's tallest building from 1974 until 1998, when it was surpassed by the Petronas Towers in Kuala Lumpur, Malaysia.

Operations
Willis has 400 offices in more than 100 countries.

Sponsorship
Willis Group was the sponsor of The Willis Resilience Expedition, a scientific program in Antarctica to better understand Global warming and build resilience to weather-related risk.

See also

Marsh McLennan

References

External links
Official website

Financial services companies established in 1828
Companies formerly listed on the New York Stock Exchange
British companies established in 1828
Financial services companies based in the City of London
Insurance companies of the United Kingdom
Risk management companies